Susan Nicole Houde-Walter (born 20 August 1954) is an academic and technical executive in the field of optics.  She was Professor of Optics at the University of Rochester from 1987-2005.  She is now running LaserMaxDefense, a manufacturer of laser equipment for military and law enforcement.  She served as president of the Optical Society in 2005 and has travelled extensively with the US military.  Currently, she is the Director of the Chester F. Carlson Center for Imaging Science at the Rochester Institute of Technology.

Early life and education 
Houde-Walter was born as Susan Nicole Houde on 20 August 1954 in New York City, to Millicent (née Svoboda), a homemaker, and Raymond Houde, M.D., a pioneer in the management of chronic pain at the Memorial Sloan-Kettering Cancer Center.  Susan was raised as graphic artist, and graduated from Sarah Lawrence College with a B.A. in liberal arts in 1976.  She subsequently took the equivalent of an undergraduate physics curriculum at the Courant Institute of Mathematical Sciences at New York University, The Institute of Optics at the University of Rochester, and the Massachusetts Institute of Technology on an un-matriculated basis while working in New York City and Cambridge, Massachusetts.  She was admitted to the masters and doctoral programs in optics at the University of Rochester in New York and produced both a master's and doctoral thesis in the area of gradient-index optics made by ion exchange in glass, thesis advisor Duncan T Moore.

Career history 
Houde-Walter taught laser physics and optical engineering at the Institute of Optics, University of Rochester beginning in  1987.  Houde-Walter was the first female regular faculty member for the first 80 years of the Institute's history.  While serving as assistant professor, she co-founded a laser manufacturing company, LaserMax, now known as LaserMaxDefense, with her husband, Will Houde-Walter, in 1989.  

Houde-Walter was elected to the Board of the Optical Society in 1994 and later elected to lead the organization as its president in 2005.  She left the University of Rochester at rank of Full Professor of Optics (tenured) in 2005 and was appointed adjunct faculty at the, University of Arizona College of Optical Sciences that same year.  Houde-Walter was selected for the 71st Joint Civilian Orientation Conference in 2006, held in United States Central Command.  Houde-Walter served a full term on the US Air Force Scientific Advisory Board,  and multiple terms on the Army Science Board.  Houde-Walter also serves on the Special Operations/Low Intensity Conflict Division Board, National Defense Industry Association.

Dr. Houde-Walter is now chief executive officer of LaserMaxDefense, a laser manufacturer based in Rochester NY that specializes in quantum cascade lasers. Dr. Houde-Walter holds over twenty patents and has published widely in the fields of optoelectronics and optical materials.  Currently, she is the Director of the Chester F. Carlson Center for Imaging Science at the Rochester Institute of Technology.

Awards and recognitions 
Houde-Walter is Fellow of both The Optical Society (1996) and the American Ceramic Society (2000).  She has been recognized for her service with the Public Service Commendation Medal, United States Department of the Army (2014) and the Commander’s Award for Public Service, United States Department of the Air Force (2016).  In 2017 Dr. Houde-Walter was named the New York Photonics Entrepreneur of the Year. In 2018 the National Women’s Hall of Fame recognized Dr. Houde-Walter with the Keeper of the Flame Award. In 2020 Houde-Walter won the Stephen D. Fantone Distinguished Service Award from The Optical Society "For outstanding service to the Society through numerous advisory and leadership roles, including 2005 President, Board of Directors Member and Chair of the Optics and Photonics News Editorial Advisory Committee."

See also
Past Presidents of the Optical Society of America

References

External links
 Articles Published by early OSA Presidents Journal of the Optical Society of America

Presidents of Optica (society)
21st-century American physicists
Sarah Lawrence College alumni
University of Rochester alumni
University of Rochester faculty
University of Arizona faculty
Living people
American technology chief executives
American women chief executives
American women physicists
1954 births
Fellows of the American Ceramic Society
Women in optics
Optical physicists
American women academics
21st-century American women scientists